Kirsten Williamson (born 1969) is a Canadian actress. She voices the character Ororo Munroe in the television series X-Men: Evolution. She also had a role as Tammy in RV. She has also appeared in Jeremiah, Da Vinci's Inquest, and Da Vinci's City Hall. She had small roles in The Last Mimzy, and in Juno as a maternity room nurse.

She is of black African (through her father) and English origin (through her mother).

External links

1969 births
Canadian television actresses
Canadian voice actresses
Living people
Black Canadian actresses
Canadian people of English descent